Yuli County as the official Romanized name, also transliterated from Mongolian as Lopnur County (Lop Nur), is a county in the Xinjiang Uyghur Autonomous Region and is under the administration of the Bayin'gholin Mongol Autonomous Prefecture. According to the 2002 census, it has a population of 100,000.

Name
The etymology was discussed in detail in the article On the Place Name Yuli and Rouran by Li Shuhui.

The name Yuli was postulated to have come from Turkic  (“one who is stationed; one who stays”), the name of a Turkic clan, and derived from (verb form , “to be stationed in”) + -gir (adjectival suffix).

History
In 2016, Tuanjie was upgraded from a township to a town.

In 2018, Xingping was upgraded from a township to a town.

Geography
The county is bordered to the northeast by Toksun County.

Climate

Administrative divisions
Yuli County includes three towns and five townships:

Towns (镇)
Yuli Town (Lopnur) ( / لوپنۇر بازىرى)
Xingping Town (formerly  / شىڭپىڭ بازىرى)
Tuanjie Town (formerly  / ئىتتىپاق بازىرى)
Townships (乡)
Tarim Township (Talimu;  /  / تارىم يېزىسى)
Dunkuotan Township ( / دۆڭقوتان يېزىسى)
Ka'erquga Township ( / قارچۇغا يېزىسى)
Aksopi Township (Akesupu, Akesufu; / / ئاقسوپى يېزىسى)
Gulbag Township ( / گۈلباغ يېزىسى)

XPCC Regiments (兵团)
 31团场 (31-تۇەن مەيدانى)
 32团场 (32-تۇەن مەيدانى)
 33团场 (33-تۇەن مەيدانى)
 34团场 (34-تۇەن مەيدانى)
 35团场 (35-تۇەن مەيدانى)

Economy
, there was about 2,960 acres (19,564 mu) of cultivated land in Yuli.

Demographics
As of 2015, 68,281 (66.20%) of the 103,143 residents of the county were Han Chinese, 33,752 (32.72%) were Uyghur and 1,110 were from other ethnic groups.

As of 1999, 70.54% of the population of Yuli (Lopnur) County was Han Chinese and 28.68% of the population was Uyghur.

As of 1997, several townships had a majority of Uyghur residents including Ka'erquga Township (98.6%), Donghetan Township (98.5%), Akesufu/Akesupu Township (90.1%), Gulebage Township (65.3%), Xingping Township (61.6%) and others.

Transportation 
China National Highway 218

Gallery

See also
 Qinggir

References

County-level divisions of Xinjiang
Populated places along the Silk Road
Bayingolin Mongol Autonomous Prefecture